Rajendra Prasad "RP" Singh (born 7 November 1974) is an Indian former footballer who played as a midfielder for Mohun Bagan and the India national team.

Early life
Singh was born in Cuttack, Odisha and is the son of former Odisha state football team captain and international footballer Debendra Prasad Singh.

Club career
Singh started playing football for SAI Hostel in Odisha in 1990 and went to play for major division Indian clubs Mohun Bagan and Mahindra United FC. He was part of the Mohun Bagan squad that won their first NFL title in the 1997–98 season.

He represented the state teams of Odisha and Bengal which played in the Santosh Trophy and was part of the Bengal team which won in the 1998 and 1999 editions.

International career
Singh made his senior national team debut against Bangladesh in the MFF Golden Jubilee Tournament held at Maldives in 2000. He played in the national team matches in the 2002 World Cup qualifiers. He was part of the national team squad that toured England in 2002 where India played against Jamaica.

Coaching career
Singh was appointed the head coach of the Odisha team for the 2013–14 Santosh Trophy season.

Honours

Mohun Bagan
 National Football League: 1997–98, 1999–2000, 2001–02
 Durand Cup: 2000
 Rovers Cup: 2000–01
 Sikkim Gold Cup: 2000, 2001
 DCM Trophy: 1997

Bengal
Santosh Trophy: 1997–98, 1998–99

Individual
NFL Best Player: 1999–2000

References

External links 
 

1974 births
Living people
People from Cuttack
Footballers from Odisha
Indian footballers
India international footballers
Mohun Bagan AC players
Mahindra United FC players
National Football League (India) players
Association football midfielders
Indian football coaches